Artistic gymnastics has been contested at the Summer Olympics since the first modern Olympic games in Athens. The Soviet Union leads the medal table.

Events

Men

Women

Medal table 
Updated after the 2020 Summer Olympics
Sources:

Men

Women

See also 

Gymnastics at the Summer Olympics
Gymnastics at the Youth Olympic Games
List of Olympic medalists in gymnastics (men)
List of Olympic medalists in gymnastics (women)

References 

 https://web.archive.org/web/20150705032224/http://www.olympic.org/

 
Gymnastics at the Summer Olympics
Olympics
Sports at the Summer Olympics